Ondřej Kučera (born 3 May 1987) is a Czech former football player. He played in the Czech 2. Liga for three seasons with FK Dukla Prague, before retiring from his professional career at the age of 24.

References

External links
 
 

Czech footballers
1987 births
Living people
FK Dukla Prague players
Association football defenders